Paul Lewis Abrams (born March 2, 1958) is a United States magistrate judge for the Central District of California and is a former nominee to be a United States district judge of the same court.

Biography

Abrams was born on March 2, 1958, in Los Angeles County, California. He received an Artium Baccalaureus degree, cum laude, in 1979 from the University of California at Berkeley. He received a Juris Doctor in 1983 from the Boalt Hall School of Law at the University of California at Berkeley. He began his legal career as an associate at the law firm of Jeffer, Mangels & Butler (now Jeffer, Mangels, Butler & Mitchell LLP) where he served from 1983 to 1985. From 1985 to 1987, he served as Director of the Bet Tzedek Legal Services' Valley Rights Project. He served as a Deputy Federal Public Defender in the Los Angeles Federal Public Defender's Office from 1987 to 2001, serving as a Supervising Deputy Federal Public Defender from 1992 to 2001. Since 2001, he has served as a United States magistrate judge in the Central District of California, also serving as a judicial officer in the court's Conviction and Sentence Alternatives Program.

Expired nomination to district court under Obama

On December 16, 2015, President Obama nominated Abrams to serve as a United States District Judge of the United States District Court for the Central District of California, to the seat being vacated by Judge Dean D. Pregerson, who took senior status on January 28, 2016. On May 18, 2016 the Judiciary Committee held a hearing on his nomination. His nomination expired on January 3, 2017, with the end of the 114th Congress.

References

1958 births
Living people
20th-century American lawyers
21st-century American judges
21st-century American lawyers
California lawyers
People from Los Angeles County, California
Public defenders
University of California, Berkeley alumni
UC Berkeley School of Law alumni
United States magistrate judges